Georgios "Yorgos" Lanthimos (born 23 September 1973) is a Greek film director, film producer, screenwriter, photographer, theatre director and former professional basketball player. Since 2015, Lanthimos has transitioned from making films in Greek to making higher-budget English-language films produced in the United Kingdom, Ireland, and the United States. In his English-language career, he has received three Academy Award nominations for his work: Best Original Screenplay for The Lobster (2015) and Best Director and Best Picture for The Favourite (2018).

Early life
Lanthimos was born in Pangrati, Athens. He was raised mainly by his mother. His father, Antonis Lanthimos, was a professional basketball player who played for Pagrati B.C. and the Greece men's national basketball team, and was also a basketball instructor at the Moraitis School. Having graduated from the Moraitis School, Lanthimos went on to study Business Administration and played for a period in Pagrati B.C. He eventually dropped out and went on to study Directing for Film and Television at the Hellenic Cinema and Television School Stavrakos (HCTSS) in Athens.

Career 
During the 1990s Lanthimos directed a series of videos for Greek dance-theater companies. Since 1995 he has directed TV commercials, music videos, short films and experimental theater plays. He was also a member of the creative team that designed the opening and closing ceremonies of the 2004 Summer Olympics in Athens.

Lanthimos's feature film career started with the 2001 mainstream film My Best Friend, which he co-directed with Lakis Lazopoulos, and the experimental film Kinetta which premiered at the 2005 Toronto Film Festival. His third feature film, Dogtooth, won the Un Certain Regard prize at the 2009 Cannes Film Festival and was nominated for Best Foreign Language Film at the 83rd Academy Awards. In 2010, he acted in and co-produced Attenberg, a Greek drama film directed by Athina Rachel Tsangari. His fourth feature film, Alps (2011), won the Osella Award for Best Screenplay at the 68th Venice International Film Festival.

The script for Lanthimos's fifth film, The Lobster, won the 2013 ARTE International Award as Best CineMart Project at the 42nd International Film Festival Rotterdam. The film was selected to compete for the Palme d'Or at the 2015 Cannes Film Festival and won the Jury Prize. At the 75th Venice Film Festival, he presented his latest work, The Favourite (2018), and won the Grand Jury Prize. The film tied for the most nominations at 91st Academy Awards, with ten, including Best Picture and Best Director for Lanthimos.

In February 2019, it was reported that Lanthimos was working on an adaptation of the Jim Thompson 1964 novel Pop. 1280, which he is set to write and direct.

Personal life
Since 2013, Lanthimos has been married to Greek-French actress Ariane Labed.

Filmography
Film

Short film

Music video

Theatre

Awards and nominations

References

External links
 
 Yorgos Lanthimos by Peter Strickland Bomb
 
 Yorgos Lanthimos at the Greek Film Centre's website

1973 births
Living people
20th-century Greek male writers
21st-century Greek male writers
European Film Award for Best Director winners
European Film Award for Best Screenwriter winners
Greek film directors
Greek film producers
Greek men's basketball players
Greek music video directors
Greek screenwriters
Greek theatre directors
Male screenwriters
Film people from Athens
Pagrati B.C. players
Basketball players from Athens
Cannes Film Festival Award for Best Screenplay winners